The women's beach volleyball tournament at the 2012 Olympic Games in London, United Kingdom, took place between July 28, 2012 and August 8, 2012 at Horse Guards Parade.

Twenty-four pairs of competitors were taking part, including one from Great Britain as the host country, and a maximum of two from each other nation. Sixteen qualified through positioning in the FIVB Beach Volleyball World Rankings as of 17 June 2012, five others earned their places at the 2010–12 Continental Beach Volleyball Cup, and the final three from the FIVB Beach Volleyball World Cup Olympic Qualification tournament.

By virtue of the two American pairings winning gold and silver, this marked the second time in Olympic history the top two women's teams were both from the same country, the first being Brazil back in 1996 when the event debuted.

Qualification

Seeds

Preliminary round

The composition of the preliminary rounds was announced confirmed on 19 July 2012 in a draw held in Klagenfurt, Austria.

Teams are awarded two points for a win and one for a loss. If two teams are tied at the end of pool play, the tiebreakers is their head-to-head match. If three or more teams are tied, the tiebreakers are (1) points ratio between tied teams, (2) points ratio within pool, and (3) tournament seed. The two best teams from each group advance to the round of 16. The two best third-placed teams also qualify. Two 'lucky loser' matches qualify two more of the third-placed teams.

All times are British Summer Time (UTC+01:00).

Pool A

|}

Pool B

|}

Pool C

|}

Pool D

|}

Pool E

|}

Pool F

|}

Lucky loser

Of the six teams that are placed third in their pools, two directly qualify for the play-offs. From the four remaining third-placed teams, another two teams qualify for the play-offs by winning a 'lucky loser' match.

This table shows the results of the third placed teams after the pool play, and before the 'lucky loser' matches.

|}

Lucky loser play-offs

Playoffs

Bracket

Round of 16

Quarterfinals

Semifinals

Bronze medal match

Final

Final ranking

See also
Beach volleyball at the 2012 Summer Olympics – Men's tournament

References

External links
Official website of the 2012 Olympic beach volleyball tournaments

Women's beach
2012 in beach volleyball
2012
2012 in women's volleyball
Women's events at the 2012 Summer Olympics